Quotations from video games
2005 neologisms